Inside the Music is a Canadian radio program, which began airing on CBC Radio One and CBC Radio 2 in 2007. Hosted by Patti Schmidt, the program airs documentaries about musicians, frequently but not exclusively Canadians.

It covers the inspiration for music, the motivations of performers, and outside events that influence a composer's work.

Musicians profiled on the series have included Joni Mitchell, Oscar Peterson, Lenny Breau, Emanuel Ax, Pinchas Zukerman, Ian Tyson, Jackie Shane, Jim Cuddy, Leonard Cohen and The Byrds.

My Playlist
My Playlist, a CBC Radio series in which a guest host is invited to play some of their own favourite songs, began as a recurring feature on Inside the Music. It now airs as a separate weekly program, although it is still produced by the same team as Inside the Music.

References

External links
 

CBC Radio One programs
CBC Music programs
Canadian music radio programs
Canadian documentary radio programs